Yingkoudao Station, literally Yingkou Road Station in English, is a station of Line 1 of the Tianjin Metro. It started operations on 12 June 2006. It is the busiest station in the network with over 100,000 users each day, peaking at 210,000 passengers. Due to the old Line 1 platforms not being built with anticipation of additional interchange traffic the station is extremely crowded. Tianjin Metro is currently planning to renovate and expand the station to better cope with the demand.

References

Railway stations in Tianjin
Railway stations in China opened in 2006
Tianjin Metro stations